The 32nd Annual Gotham Awards, presented by The Gotham Film & Media Institute, were held on November 28, 2022. The nominees were announced on October 25, 2022, by Angelica Ross and Jeffrey Sharp. Actors Adam Sandler and Michelle Williams, filmmaker Gina Prince-Bythewood, film executives Jason Cassidy and Peter Kujawski, entrepreneur Don Katz, and the cast of Fire Island all received tribute awards. Additionally, actor and filmmaker Sidney Poitier was posthumously recognized with the Icon Tribute award.

Winners and nominees

Film

Films with multiple wins and nominations

Television

Special awards

Ensemble Tribute
 Fire Island – Nick Adams, Joel Kim Booster, Margaret Cho, Tomás Matos, Torian Miller, Zane Phillips, Conrad Ricamora, Matt Rogers, James Scully, and Bowen Yang

Filmmaker Tribute
 Gina Prince-Bythewood

Gotham Impact Salute
 Venice Film Festival

Icon Tribute
 Sidney Poitier (posthumous)

Industry Tribute
 Jason Cassidy and Peter Kujawski

Innovator Tribute
 Don Katz

Performer Tribute
 Adam Sandler
 Michelle Williams

See also
 38th Independent Spirit Awards

References

External links
 

2022 film awards
2022
2022 television awards
2022 in American cinema
2022 awards in the United States